There are 37 townlands in Tobermore electoral ward, with 22 of these also constituting the parish of Kilcronaghan. All townlands below are listed with the earliest recorded date of their modern variation as well as the Irish origin if applicable, along with a select list of earlier variations with date.

Kilcronaghan ecclesiastical and civil parish

There are 23 townlands in the ecclesiastical parish of Kilcronaghan. The civil parish however only contains 21, with Tullyroan and Drumballyhagan Clark being omitted. The townland of Keenaght is the only one that doesn't also form part of Tobermore electoral ward.

Tobermore electoral ward
There are 37 townlands within Tobermore electoral ward, the majority of which (twenty-two) reside in Kilcronaghan parish. The rest form parts of neighbouring parishes. These additional townlands are:

See also
Kilcronaghan
List of townlands in County Londonderry
Tobermore

References

Townlands of County Londonderry